Polyglutamic acid (PGA) is a polymer of the amino acid glutamic acid (GA).  Gamma PGA (Poly-γ-glutamic acid, γ-PGA) - the form where the peptide bonds are between the amino group of GA and the carboxyl group at the end of the GA side chain - is a major constituent of the Japanese food nattō.  Gamma PGA is formed by bacterial fermentation.

Gamma PGA has a wide number of potential uses ranging from food, medicine  and cosmeceuticals to water treatment.

The other isomer, poly-α-glutamic acid is being used as a drug delivery system in cancer treatment and research is underway for its application in a treatment of type I diabetes and its potential use in the production of an AIDS vaccine.

Heavy metal removal
G-PGA covalently incorporated into microfiltration membranes via attachment to their membrane pore surfaces exhibited super-high heavy metal sorption ability.
G-PGA was found to bind and efficiently remove 99.8% of lead ions from water via a suitable low-pressure ultrafiltration technique. Inbaraj et al. (2006)

References

Polyamides